Alberto Falcone is a fictional comic book villain appearing in books published by DC Comics, in particular the Batman books. In addition to being a mobster, he has also taken credit to be serial killer the Holiday Killer in Batman: The Long Halloween and Batman: Dark Victory.

Publication history
Alberto Falcone first appeared in Batman: The Long Halloween #1 and was created by Jeph Loeb and Tim Sale.

Fictional character biography
Born to Gotham City crime lord Carmine Falcone on February 14, Alberto earned a scholarship to Harvard University and attended Oxford. As a young man, he is eager to follow his father's footsteps as a crime boss, but Carmine rebuffed his son's efforts; it is suggested that Carmine simply wants him to have a normal life, but does not know how to express those feelings. Alberto is nevertheless hurt and angered by the perceived slight, and grows pathologically jealous of his siblings, Mario and Sofia, as they are allowed to take part in the "family business", when in reality Carmine loved all of them equally and unconditional, but wanted to save Alberto from living the same criminal life he has.

Batman: The Long Halloween
Throughout Batman: The Long Halloween, various Gotham City criminals are murdered by a mysterious vigilante known as "the Holiday Killer". At first, the murdered criminals are connected to Carmine Falcone, starting with the death of his nephew, Johnny Viti. "The Irish", a gang of Irish hitmen for hire, are all put under Carmine Falcone's payroll to kill then-district-attorney Harvey Dent by blowing up his house. Later, on Thanksgiving, they are all murdered in a hotel banquet room as they sit down to eat Thanksgiving dinner. By Christmas, Milos Grappa, Carmine Falcone's bodyguard is murdered in front of Don's building. It initially seems to be the work of one of Falcone's rivals. On New Year's Eve, however, Alberto Falcone is apparently killed by Holiday during a party on board Falcone's yacht. His body is found and identified by his father and Jasper Dolan, the Gotham City coroner.

During the next few months Holiday starts killing members of Sal Maroni's mob. This leads to a huge gang war between Falcone and the Maronis, forcing Falcone to employ "freaks" such as Riddler and Poison Ivy to stabilize his empire. A large number of Maroni's soldiers are killed alongside some of Falcone's guards at Maroni's only legitimate business; an Italian restaurant. A number of Maroni's men are assassinated at his safe house on St. Patrick's Day, just before Falcone's daughter could go there and pull a hit on them herself. On April Fools' Day, Riddler is attacked but left unharmed, so he could publicly tell that Falcone was actively looking for Holiday himself. Holiday's guns are traced back to Gotham's Chinatown neighborhood, but the Chinese gun-maker is found murdered inside his shop on Mother's Day.

On Father's Day, Sal "Boss" Maroni's father, Luigi Maroni, is shot and killed in his tomato-garden. During the Independence Day celebrations, Jasper Dolan, the coroner, is found dead at Gotham Docks with two bullets in his chest. Alberto Falcone's aunt, Carla Viti, launches an investigation of her own into her son Johnny's death, only to be fatally shot at the coroner's office on the day of what would have a "Roman" holiday, Carmine Falcone's own birthday.

On Labor Day, while Sal "Boss" Maroni is being transported to a safer area after disfiguring Harvey Dent in court, Alberto Falcone appears from nowhere and kills him with two shots to the head. He is arrested by Jim Gordon after Batman beats him so badly he loses feeling in one arm.

Alberto later admits to committing all of the Holiday murders, including that of his cousin, Johnny Viti. His father offers to use his influence to free Alberto, if he only admits to killing Maroni. Alberto refuses, however, smugly bragging that his new reputation as Holiday makes him much bigger than his father and all the gangsters in the mob put together; Alberto then tells his father that the days of the mob controlling Gotham are over, and that "freaks" like himself will be the ones to control the city's fate from now on. He is convicted by the jury and sentenced to the gas chamber. Although Alberto initially receives the death sentence, his unstable mental state allows him to instead plead insanity. He is imprisoned in Arkham Asylum instead, across the hall from the Calendar Man, another holiday-obsessed villain who is afraid that Holiday might overshadow him.

Batman: Dark Victory
Despite the warnings of Commissioner Gordon, Alberto is released from Arkham with the help of Janice Porter, Dent's replacement as Gotham's district attorney; Porter argues that Alberto has been deemed 'cured' and that he was the victim of various civil rights violations during his arrest due to the brutal beating he received from Batman, to the extent that his right arm is still disfigured and apparently useless. He is placed under house arrest at the Falcone compound outside Gotham, with a tracer is attached to his leg to prevent escape. 

While in the house, Alberto is manipulated by The Scarecrow and Calendar Man into believing that he is being contacted by Carmine's ghost; the Scarecrow, a former psychologist, determines that Alberto is most afraid of his father, and the Calendar Man poses as the Roman's 'ghost' to permanently eliminate his 'rival'. The gun from the Holiday murders is soon left in his possession, which he uses to save Sofia from The Joker, the judges letting Alberto off on the potential violation of his parole due to the "exceptional circumstances" of saving his sister's life. On Carmine Falcone's birthday, Alberto receives another gun to kill Sofia to usurp powers of the five crime families (actually a part of Two-Face's plan to destroy the crime families). Alberto nearly kills her in a Holiday-style shooting, but ultimately stops himself.

Following Janice Porter's death, Two-Face has her body left in Alberto's bed to trick him into thinking he had killed her. This time Scarecrow uses his fear toxins to make Alberto hallucinate that his father's voice is commanding him to commit suicide. Alberto then knows that the voice is not real — his father did not believe in suicide — and he exposes Calendar Man. What happens next is never explicitly shown, but later events suggest that Calendar Man shoots and wounds Alberto, at which point Sofia Falcone attacks Calendar Man, breaking his jaw and attaching her brother's electronic monitoring ankle collar to him, leaving him unconscious outside the Falcone estate for Batman and the authorities to find (Sofia's role is not explicitly confirmed, but Gordon and Batman appear doubtful that Alberto could have injured the Calendar Man so badly himself). Sofia then takes her wounded brother to a hiding place in the Falcone mausoleum. There Sofia criticizes Alberto for complaining about the pain, recalling how Carmine had survived five shots to the chest. Alberto replies that he is not his father. Sofia, disgusted, agrees with this assessment and smothers him to death.

Alberto is later revealed to be the father of Kitrina Falcone.

In other media

Film
Alberto Falcone appears in the animated film Batman: The Long Halloween, voiced by Jack Quaid. Here, he is portrayed as much less willing to be related to his father, even stating before he was murdered that he has no interest in taking after Carmine, especially in terms of the family business, and would much rather have a normal life far from Gotham with his own family. Part Two reveals that he was married to Gilda Dent before she married Harvey, but his father disapproved of the relationship, going so far as to force Gilda to have an abortion after the marriage was annulled. Because Alberto didn't stand up to his father, Gilda (here the true Holiday killer) kills Alberto in revenge.

Video games
Alberto Falcone appears in Batman: Arkham Origins, voiced by Quinton Flynn. He is shown being tortured by Penguin who wants Alberto to convince his father to retire from the weapons business only for Batman to intervene. It is also implied in a conversation late in the game that Alberto Falcone managed to convince his father to retire from the weapons business. Alberto is described as suffering from some form of mental illness. Recorded conversations collected by Enigma indicate Alberto is undergoing psychiatric treatment, while another confirms his mental illness and murderous alter-ego Holiday. A series of holiday-related killings are described in-game, but these are attributed to Calendar Man rather than Alberto.

See also
 List of Batman family adversaries

References

External links
 
 

Characters created by Jeph Loeb
Comics characters introduced in 1996
Fictional Harvard University people
Fictional gangsters
Fictional serial killers
Fictional Italian American people
DC Comics male supervillains
DC Comics supervillains
Fratricide in fiction
Fictional murdered people